Jean Anderson (1907–2001) was an English actress.

Jean Anderson may also refer to:

 Jean Anderson (golfer) (1921–1984), Scottish golfer
 Jean Anderson (cookbook author) (1929–2023), American cookbook author
 Jean Anderson (dancer) (1939–1985), Canadian dancer
 Jean R. Anderson (born 1953), obstetrician and gynaecologist

See also
 Jean Andersen (born 1988), South African tennis player	
 Gene Anderson (disambiguation)